Lewis Trimmer (born 30 October 1989 in Norwich) is an English former professional footballer.

Career
Trimmer began his footballing career as a trainee with Mansfield Town in August 2006. He made his debut as a 79th-minute substitute in the Football League Two match against Bury in May 2007, and made a second appearance against Wycombe Wanderers in January 2008. By the end of the 2007–08 season, he had made three substitute appearances for Mansfield Town. After Mansfield Town were relegated to the Football Conference at the end of the 2007–08 season, he was out of contract but signed a new one-year contract.

He spent some time on loan at Glapwell that season but his contract was not renewed by Mansfield, again, one season later.

In August 2009 he signed for Belper Town but departed from the club in October. He subsequently joined Rainworth Miners Welfare.

In June 2010 he joined Carlton Town.

He joined Cambridge City in August 2011 on non-contract terms after appearing in pre-season games and went out on loan to Newmarket Town appearing twice on loan

In November 2011 he joined Cambridge University Press.

Lewis now plays an integral part in Tuesday night football at Hinchingbrooke School for the Alconbury Weald lads! Gwan Son!!

References

External links

1989 births
Living people
Footballers from Norwich
English footballers
English Football League players
Association football forwards
Mansfield Town F.C. players
Glapwell F.C. players
Belper Town F.C. players
Rainworth Miners Welfare F.C. players
Carlton Town F.C. players
Cambridge City F.C. players
Newmarket Town F.C. players
Cambridge University Press F.C. players